María José Zaldívar Larraín (16 September 1975) is a Chilean lawyer and politician who served as the Minister of Labour and Social Welfare in the second government of Sebastián Piñera.

References 

21st-century Chilean women politicians
21st-century Chilean politicians
Living people
Year of birth missing (living people)
Women government ministers of Chile
Labour ministers of Chile
Social affairs ministers of Chile